Linda M. LeMura (born April 25, 1960) is an American scientist and academic who is the current and 14th President of Le Moyne College in Syracuse, N.Y., the youngest of the 27 Jesuit colleges and universities in the United States. She is the first female layperson to be named the president of a Jesuit institution of higher education in the world.

Prior to being appointed president in 2014, LeMura served Le Moyne as the provost and vice president for academic affairs from 2007 to 2014 and dean of the College of Arts and Sciences from 2003 to 2007. Previously, she was professor, research scientist, and graduate program director of the Departments of Biology and Allied Health Sciences and Exercise Physiology at Bloomsburg University of Pennsylvania. She is the author or co-author of over 30 scientific articles in peer-reviewed journals, a book review, 2 books, and numerous externally funded grant proposals.

Early life and education 

LeMura grew up in Syracuse, New York, one of six siblings of Italian immigrant parents. She graduated from Bishop Grimes High School in Syracuse where she was a three-sport athlete and an honors student. A first-generation college student, LeMura received a B.S. degree summa cum laude from Niagara University with majors in biology and education. In subsequent study at Syracuse University, she received an M.S. in 1983 and a Ph.D. in 1987 in applied physiology.

Le Moyne College 
LeMura is the current president of Le Moyne College, appointed unanimously by the College’s Board of Trustees to that position, effective July 1, 2014. In December 2021, Le Moyne's Board of Trustees approved a four-year extension for LeMura, extending her contract through June 30, 2026. During her presidency, Le Moyne has achieved record-breaking fundraising and enrollment goals. The College completed the $100 million Always Forward campaign, the largest campaign in the College’s 75-year history, ahead of schedule in February 2021. She has also overseen seven years of the largest class enrollments at the College.

During her tenure, the College completed the renovation of the Coyne Science Center and received naming gifts for the Purcell School of Professional Studies and the McNeil Risk Management and Insurance Institute. New programs developed during this period include the College’s first doctoral program, an Ed.D. in Executive Leadership; master’s programs in Occupational Therapy and Family Nurse Practitioner, and a major in Cybersecurity. The College will be expanding the risk management and insurance program to both a major and a minor in this field. The Noreen Reale Falcone Library renovation, designed by Holt Architects,  received a “Citation of Design” award from the CNY AIA Chapter. The Science Center Addition, completed in 2012 and designed by Ashley McGraw, is a testament to green design and is LEED Certified at the Gold Level.

A hallmark of LeMura’s time as president and provost is the development of collaborative partnerships with other universities, many of which allow students to complete both a bachelor’s and an advanced degree in a shortened time period. Le Moyne has dual degree partnerships in Nursing with the Pomeroy College of Nursing at Crouse Hospital (Degree in Three) and the St. Joseph’s College of Nursing at St. Joseph’s Hospital Health Center. Joint degree programs in law exist with Syracuse University, Suffolk University, Albany Law School and SUNY Buffalo. Other cooperative programs include engineering programs with Syracuse University, a B.S./M.D. program with State University of New York Upstate Medical University, a B.S./D.D.S. program at State University of New York at Buffalo School of Dental Medicine, a program in communication with S.I. Newhouse School of Public Administration at Syracuse University and a program in public administration at the Maxwell School of Citizenship and Public Affairs at Syracuse University.

Other initiatives include programs to impact and work collaboratively with the greater Syracuse community to improve the lives and education of those in the Central New York region. The Healthcare Advance Resource Center (HARC) provides additional training and education to enable healthcare providers with international training to obtain the credentials and certifications to work in the U.S. healthcare sector. ERIE 21 (Educating for our Rising Innovation Economy)  offers transformative opportunities and programming for Syracuse’s youth, from middle school through college, to meet the technology needs of a twenty-first-century labor force.In 2022, LeMura was appointed Co-Chair of the Central New York Regional Economic Development Council on which she has served since 2015. The purpose of the Council is to promote the economic development of New York State and its communities, to encourage sound practices in the conduct of regional and statewide development programs, and to develop education programs that enhance the professional development skills of its members. 

As Provost and Vice President for Academic Affairs at Le Moyne from 2007 to 2014, LeMura played a pivotal role in the establishment of the Madden School of Business and the revision of the College’s Core Curriculum. She was appointed Dean of the College of Arts and Sciences in 2003.

Bloomsburg University of Pennsylvania 

LeMura was at Bloomsburg University from 1987 to 2003. LeMura was a professor and a research scientist in the departments of  Biology and Health Sciences and Exercise Physiology. She served as Graduate Program Director and Interim Associate Dean of the College of Arts and Sciences. Her research interests include pediatric obesity, pediatric applied physiology, and lipid and energy metabolism.  She is the author or co-author of over 30 scientific articles in peer-reviewed journals, a book review, 26 grant proposals, and 2 books. She has been a research consultant for the U.S. and the Italian Olympic Committees.

Honors and affiliations 

In addition to her role as college president, LeMura is involved in a number of local, national, and international education and civic organizations and has received numerous awards for her leadership and community engagement.

LeMura is on the boards of the Council of Independent Colleges and Universities, the College of the Holy Cross, and the Board of Directors of the Association of Jesuit Colleges and Universities, where she serves on both the Executive Committee and the Mission and Identity Advisory Committee. She also serves on the Board of the International Association of Jesuit Universities, where she was a founding delegate, and the Association of Catholic Colleges and Universities. In 2021, she will become Chair of the NE10 Athletic Conference.

LeMura is deeply committed to the growth and revitalization of Syracuse and the Central New York region. Local leadership includes service on the boards of the Regional Economic Development Council in Central New York, CenterState CEO, Syracuse 2020, and Syracuse Surge. LeMura previously served on the boards of Syracuse Symphony, the Everson Museum and the Syracuse International Film Festival. In 2017, she was named one of several key members of the transition team for newly-elected Syracuse Mayor Ben Walsh.

In 2019, LeMura received the Syracuse Key4Women Achieve Award, and the  AT&T CNY Women in STEM, Partners for Education and Business, Inc. In 2017, she was named Citizen of the Year by Temple Adath Yeshurun, Syracuse, N.Y.; received the Bishop's Award from the Diocese of Syracuse Catholic Charities; and received the Ensuring Our Future Award from Cristo Rey New York High School. In 2016, Le Moyne College was named Non-profit Business of the Year by Centerstate CEO and LeMura was recognized as a Woman of Distinction by the New York State Senate. 

She is a Fellow of the American College of Sports Medicine.

Personal   

LeMura is married to Lawrence Tanner, a professor of environmental systems science at Le Moyne College. They have one daughter, Emily Marie Tanner.

References 

1960 births
Living people
American university and college faculty deans
American people of Italian descent
Syracuse University alumni
Niagara University alumni
Presidents of Le Moyne College
Women heads of universities and colleges
Bloomsburg University of Pennsylvania
People from Syracuse, New York